The Virginia Avenue Tunnel is a railroad tunnel in Washington, D.C. owned by CSX Transportation. It is part of the CSX RF&P Subdivision and serves freight trains along the eastern seaboard routes, providing a bypass around Union Station.

The double-tracked tunnel is located under Virginia Avenue SE, from 11th Street SE to 2nd Street SE. The eastern portal connects to the Anacostia Railroad Bridge and the CSX Capital Subdivision. At the western end the RF&P Sub runs to the Long Bridge into Virginia.

CSX rebuilt the tunnel to replace its deteriorated structure and increase capacity to allow double-stacked containers to pass through. Construction began in 2015 and the project completed in 2018.

History
The tunnel was constructed in 1872 by the Baltimore and Potomac Railroad (B&P), later controlled by the Pennsylvania Railroad. It originally served the B&P station on the present-day site of the National Gallery of Art, on the National Mall at 6th & B Street NW (today's Constitution Avenue). The tunnel was built using the cut and cover method. It was constructed of ashlar stone for the sidewalls, and brick and stone for the arches. In 1904 the tunnel was extended to its present length due to a track relocation.

Initially the tunnel served both freight and passenger service until Union Station's opening in 1908, and since that time it has been freight-only. The tunnel's second track was removed in 1936 to accommodate electrification and increasingly large railroad equipment.

Tunnel modifications
In 2008, CSX proposed to modify or replace the tunnel to provide room for a second track and sufficient height to allow use of double-stack freight cars and autoracks. The railroad also planned to address the tunnel's deteriorated structure, in particular its cracked masonry and failing drainage system.

CSX sought government funding in a public-private partnership as part of its National Gateway initiative. In 2011, CSX announced that it would fund the tunnel project itself. In 2012, CSX and government agencies considered four design alternatives for a new tunnel, conducting public outreach meetings, and preparing an environmental impact assessment for each of the alternatives. A final decision on the selected alternative was expected in spring 2013.

Environmental impact statements and objections to the proposal
CSX released its Draft Environmental Impact Statement (DEIS) in July 2013. During the comment period, many Capitol Hill and Navy Yard residents raised objections to the DEIS. Organizations which submitted comments to CSX criticizing elements of the DEIS include Casey Trees, the Capitol Hill Restoration Society (CHRS), the Sierra Club, and the Committee of 100 on the Federal City. CHRS filed an additional comment concerning review of the Virginia Avenue Tunnel project under Section 106 of the National Historic Preservation Act of 1966, raising concerns about negative project impacts on historic structures (including those of religious and military value), economic impact on Barracks Row Main Street, and the project's "adverse effect on the L'Enfant Plan." Individuals in favor of the tunnel have dismissed the claims as being a classic case of NIMBYism. The United States Environmental Protection Agency also released an official opinion on the DEIS in which they identified in detail "deficiencies and areas of concern, including environmental justice, children's environmental health, cumulative impacts, and community impacts, especially vibration, parks, visual, and utility disruptions." CSX stated in the DEIS that it wishes to keep rail traffic moving during the construction by using the cut and cover method, which would avoid over-stressing their infrastructure while lowering the cost of the project. This would require the on-and-off closure of varying parts of Virginia Avenue for three years, however.

After the 2013 Lac-Mégantic disaster and the ensuing national controversy about crude oil being transported by rail, the improvement of the tunnel leading to increased crude shipments through the city became a major concern. When asked about this during a public hearing, CSX said that the improvement of the tunnel would not lead to increased shipments of crude oil.

The D.C. Department of Transportation (DDOT) and Federal Highway Administration (FHWA) announced in 2013 that the Final Environmental Impact Statement (FEIS) would be released for public review in the following few weeks. After release, the statement will be up for a 30-day public review period, during which a public meeting will also be held. The FHWA will then decide if it will approve the project; if approved, the DDOT then would decide if it will grant construction permits to CSX. Public funds would not be allocated to the project, as CSX has said they will fund the estimated US$200 million project in full.

Some opponents of the project like James McPhillips, an attorney, activist, and resident of the Navy Yard neighborhood, suggest that the fact the report has made it into the final stage means that CSX, DDOT, and the FHWA have cut corners and collaborated to get the project approved as soon as possible without addressing the concerns of locals. In doing so, the opposition says that the prospect other potentially feasible options that residents would approve of were unfairly ignored, and should have been researched before the impact of the current proposal. The DEIS published by CSX outlines three potential options for tunnel renovation. Congressional Delegate Eleanor Holmes Norton asked the U.S. Secretary of Transportation Anthony Foxx in April 2014 on behalf of the community to expedite the release of the FEIS to provide closure on the issue, which had been going on 6 years at that point. "I ask that you help ensure the prompt release of the Final (Environmental Impact Statement) for the Virginia Avenue Tunnel project so that the surrounding community is aware of the preferred alternative, any impacts this project may have on them, and any mitigation and benefits to the surrounding community."

FHWA released a 2,639 page FEIS on June 13, 2014. The final recommendation rejected options that called for re-routing train traffic off of Capitol Hill in favor of new rail lines through Southern Maryland, which would have cost between $3.2 and $4.2 billion. Instead, the selected alternative would run trains through the Virginia Avenue Tunnel while a portion of the new project is constructed. Next, trains would use the new tunnel while a second one is completed.

The FEIS included offers of some financial compensation to "residents most harmed by the project" although residents claim the money is not worth the risk the project poses to their lives and livelihoods.

The Washington Post discovered in Appendix A of the FEIS that DDOT issued an occupancy permit in 2012 guaranteeing CSX Transportation the right-of-way at Virginia Avenue SE and adjacent roads prior to the completion of the review period. Additional agreements indicate that upon conclusion of the project, CSX would be entitled to a permanent right-of-way.

Delegate Norton asked the DOT Secretary for a review period extension on the Virginia Avenue Tunnel EIS, saying "Residents will be substantially affected, often negatively, by any construction on the Virginia Avenue Tunnel, and they need to be afforded sufficient time to review the documents and the ability to alert federal officials to any oversights.”

FHWA approval
The FHWA issued a Record of Decision, approving the tunnel project on November 4, 2014. Construction is expected to be completed in 2018. Lawsuits attempting to stop the project were denied in court decisions, and construction on the project began in 2015.

Project completion
The first phase of the project was completed on December 23, 2016, when the first double-stack train passed through the newly constructed parallel tunnel. The full project was completed in fall 2018.

See also
First Street Tunnel (Washington, D.C.)

References

 Wright, William (2006). "Chapter 1: Railroading Washington." History of Union Station. Unpublished manuscript. www.washingtonunionstation.com.

External links
 Heavy Rail Track and Structures in Washington DC - BelowTheCapital.org
 Virginia Avenue Tunnel Project - New tunnel project status; maps, photos & drawings

Railroad tunnels in Washington, D.C.
CSX Transportation tunnels
Pennsylvania Railroad tunnels
Tunnels completed in 1872